Cheshmeh Sefid (also Romanized as Cheshmeh Sefīd; also known as Cheshmeh Sefīd-e ‘Olyā) is a village in Mahidasht Rural District, Mahidasht District, Kermanshah County, Kermanshah Province, Iran. At the 2006 census, its population was 921, in 244 families.

References 

Populated places in Kermanshah County